Potter Township is the name of some places in the U.S. state of Pennsylvania:

Potter Township, Beaver County, Pennsylvania
Potter Township, Centre County, Pennsylvania

Pennsylvania township disambiguation pages